Churchtown railway station was on the West Lancashire Railway (WLR) in England. It opened in 1878 and served the Southport suburb of Churchtown.

History
In the Churchtown area, the railway ran above the streets on an embankment, and crossed Cambridge Road on an iron bridge. The station was on the east side of Cambridge Road immediately after the bridge, with the booking office situated at street level, on the westbound side of the station, roughly where Churchtown Medical Centre stands today.

Originally services ran from Southport Central to Preston Fishergate Hill. However, upon the WLR's absorption by the Lancashire and Yorkshire Railway in 1901, both termini were closed to passengers and became goods depots. Services then ran from Southport Chapel Street to Preston.

The  section of the Southport-Preston line running from Southport Chapel Street station to Crossens station was electrified by the LYR in 1904 using the same 630V DC system as had been installed on the Liverpool-Southport line a few months earlier. Consequently, after this date, travellers from Churchtown station used both electric and steam-hauled trains.

Upon closure of the West Lancashire Railway in 1964, Churchtown station was demolished within days, to prevent any possible acts of vandalism and arson, as the station had been made entirely of wood (as with Penwortham Cop Lane railway station), along with both of its platforms.

The bridge was dismantled during 1965 and the embankments on either side removed soon afterwards.

References

Disused railway stations in the Metropolitan Borough of Sefton
Buildings and structures in Southport
Former Lancashire and Yorkshire Railway stations
Beeching closures in England
Railway stations in Great Britain closed in 1964
Railway stations in Great Britain opened in 1878